The Best FIFA Men's Player is an association football award presented annually by the sport's governing body, FIFA, since 2016, to honour the player deemed to have performed the best over the previous calendar year. The award was formerly known as the FIFA World Player of the Year, which was merged with France Footballs Ballon d'Or in 2010 to become the FIFA Ballon d'Or in a six-year partnership.

History
In 2010, the FIFA World Player of the Year award combined with the Ballon d'Or to create the FIFA Ballon d'Or in a six-year partnership. FIFA presided over the FIFA Ballon d'Or after agreeing to pay £13million for the merge of the two major player awards with France Football. The six editions of the FIFA Ballon d'Or were dominated by Lionel Messi and Cristiano Ronaldo, as part of their ongoing rivalry. In 2016, the Ballon d’Or again lost its "FIFA" tag and would be voted for exclusively by journalists, while the FIFA World Player of the Year award – which ran from 1991 to 2009 – was resurrected, this time as The Best FIFA Men's Player.

According to reports, FIFA's decision not to renew the deal was made in order to improve the organization's strained relationship with England's FA. This was based on the fact the annual ceremony was held in Zürich – and new FIFA president Gianni Infantino wanted to move the next one to London.

The trophy was designed by Croatian artist Ana Barbić Katičić.

Criteria and voting
The selection criteria for the players of the year are sporting performance, as well as general conduct on and off the pitch.

The votes are decided by media representatives, national team coaches, and national team captains. In October 2016, it was announced that the general public would also be allowed to vote. Each group has 25% of the overall vote.

Winners

Wins by player

Wins by country

Wins by club

FIFA Player of the Year (including predecessors)

See also
 The Best FIFA Football Awards
 The Best FIFA Women's Player
 FIFA World Player of the Year
 FIFA Ballon d'Or
 Ballon d'Or

Notes

References

External links
 Official Facebook website
 Top FIFA Football Players 2022

The Best FIFA Football Awards
Fifa Men
Awards established in 2016